Calvin "Cal" Bahr (born July 17, 1962) is an American businessman and politician serving since 2023 as a member of the Minnesota Senate. A member of the Republican Party of Minnesota, he represents the 31st district, in the northern Twin Cities metropolitan area.

Career
Bahr was in the United States Army from 1980 to 1989. He was a member of the Upper Rum River Water Management Organization board.

Minnesota House of Representatives
Bahr was elected to the Minnesota House of Representatives in 2016. He won the Republican endorsement over incumbent Tom Hackbarth and defeated him in the Republican primary. He was reelected in 2018. On December 7, 2018, Bahr and three other House members left the GOP House Caucus to form the New House Republican Caucus due to dissatisfaction with the House Republican leadership. The caucus has introduced bills that feature their strong interest in constitutional issues as well as their own budget proposal.

Minnesota House of Representatives

In 2022, Bahr ran for the open 31st State Senate seat, after incumbent Michelle Benson retired. He won the Republican primary with 78.6% of the vote, and defeated Democratic nominee Jason Ruffalo in the general election.

Bahr is considered one of the Senate's farthest-right members.

Electoral history
 2022 Minnesota Senate race — District 31
 Cal Bahr (R) 63.7% (25,705 votes)
 Jason Ruffalo (DFL), 36.2% (14,585 votes)
 Write-in, 0.1% (22 votes)
 2020 Minnesota House of Representatives race — District 31B
 Cal Bahr (R) 67.1% (17,447 votes)
 Susan Larson (DFL), 32.8% (8,532 votes)
 Write-in, 0.1% (22 votes)
 2018 Minnesota House of Representatives race — District 31B
 Cal Bahr (R) 64.4% (12,840 votes)
 Susan Larson (DFL), 35.5% (7,080 votes)
 Write-in, 0.1% (18 votes)
 2016 Minnesota House of Representatives race — District 31B
 Cal Bahr (R) 66.53% (14,785 votes)
 Susan Larson (DFL), 33.47% (7,438 votes)

Personal life
Bahr had two daughters with his first wife. Combined, he and his second wife, Ellen, who died in 2020, have four children and three grandchildren. Bahr resides in East Bethel, Minnesota.

References

External links

 Senator Cal Bahr official Minnesota Senate website
 Official campaign website

1960s births
Living people
Republican Party members of the Minnesota House of Representatives
21st-century American politicians
People from Anoka County, Minnesota
People from Cook County, Illinois
Military personnel from Illinois
Military personnel from Minnesota